Comedy Club with Champions is a Nepali stand-up comedy and talk show broadcast on Nepal Television and distributed by OSR Digital on YouTube every Monday. It is hosted by Bishal Bhandari; the first episode premiered on March 21, 2022. The first 23 episodes were directed by Bhandari himself; since then Bkey Agarwal took over as a director of the show. Deepa Shree Niraula has taken the role of permanent guest.

Cast 

 Bishal Bhandari as Himself (Host)
 Deepa Shree Niraula as Permanent guest
 Suman Karki as Various characters especially mimicry characters including Rishi Dhamala (mimic), Shivahari Poudel (mimic), and KP Sharma Oli (mimic)
 Sajan Shrestha as Solution Baba, Radhe, and other various characters
 Kailash Karki as Bhikari (beggar), and other various characters
 Mexam Gaudel as Shyam, and other various characters
 Pawan Bhattarai as Gaine Shree Shramlal Subedi aka Ganga Prasad Gaine, and other various characters
 Sundar Khanal as Pandit, Parajaya Kumar Pandey (mimicry of Vijay Kumar Pandey), Chiplaune Uncle (mimicry of Prakash Subedi), Madan Krishna Shrestha (mimic)
 Santosh Thapa as Nepali Teacher, Hari Bansha Acharya (mimic)
 Umesh Rai as Fulandeko Aama
 Usha Rajak as Various characters
 Suman Koirala as Dale Dai, Pushpa Kamal Dahal (mimic), and other various characters
 Bkey Agarwal as Host (on first episode only)

See also 
Similar shows
 Comedy Champion
 Mundre Ko Comedy Club

References

External links 

 OSR Reality on YouTube

Nepalese television series
Nepalese television talk shows